Krishnankoil Venkadachalam Mahadevan (14 March 1918 – 21 June 2001) was an Indian composer, singer-songwriter, music producer, and musician known for his works in Tamil, Telugu, Malayalam, and Kannada films. He is best known for his contributions in works such as Manchi Manasulu (1962), Lava Kusa (1963), Thiruvilaiyadal (1965), Saraswathi Sabatham (1966), Kandan Karunai (1967),  Thillana Mohanambal (1968), Adimai Penn (1969), Balaraju Katha (1970), Athiparasakthi (1971), Sankarabharanam (1979), Saptapadi (1981), Sirivennela (1986), Sruthilayalu (1987), Pelli Pustakam (1991), and Swathi Kiranam (1992).

A contemporary of M. S. Viswanathan and T. K. Ramamoorthy,  starting his career in 1942 with Manonmani, Mahadevan scored music for over six hundred feature films, spanning four decades, and has garnered two National Film Awards, three Andhra Pradesh state Nandi Awards, a Tamil Nadu State Film Award, and a Filmfare Award South. He was also conferred the title of "Thirai Isai Thilagam" (Pride of Cine Music Directors) in Tamil cinema. His assistant Pukazhenthi is credited to have usually writing the score and arranging the orchestra, after Mahadevan composes a tune.

Early life and career

K. V. Mahadevan was born in 1918 at Krishnancoil, a locality in Nagercoil, Kanyakumari District. Father Venkadachalam Bhagavathar and Mother Pichaiyammal
K. V. Mahadevan, also called by his honorific name Thirai Isai Thilagam (lit. pride of film music), did music composing for more than 50 years, beginning from 1942 until 1993.

Telugu Film Industry crowned him with title "Swara Brahma" (Creator/Father of Musical notes). 
His song "mama mama mama" from 1962 Telugu movie Manchi Manasulu became popular those days,as a result, Telugu film industry with love started calling him "Mama" since then.

His favorite music instrument is Nadaswaram similar to (Shehnai).It could be the reason his compositions have always reflected its mellifluous pattern.
Another great characteristic from this scholar as it is known to everyone and open fact that he never asked lyricist to write lyrics for his earlier composed tunes. Always composed tunes to written lyrics.Very few in India have been able to exercise this feat with success.

Music has no Language barriers. 
“Sisurvethi, pasurvethi, vethiganarasamphanihi” is a popular Sanskrit axiom which says that Music has the power to impress a child, animal, and the universe alike.
As we can read from Climax song of film Sankarabharanam (1980 film), "Tatva Saadhana ku Satya Shodhana ku Sangeethame Sopanam" (Music is a Stair Case for attaining Enlightenment and truth discovery)

"Swara Brahma" left no foot prints of his mother tongue when it comes to his scores in other languages.
Telugu language being inherited from Sanskrit, has its own nativity which composers of Telugu as their mother tongue and "North" (O. P. Nayyar), "West" (C. Ramchandra), (Shankar–Jaikishan), (Laxmikant–Pyarelal), (Chirrantan Bhatt), "East" (R. D. Burman), (Salil Chowdhury), (Ravindra Jain), (Bappi Lahiri) like composers could fulfill effortlessly.
"Swara Brahma" automatically had fallen into that groove as he was getting to know meaning of lyrics for every song before composing them. Assistant Puhalendi too exhibited similar characteristics as it was evident from interludes orchestration.

According to famous Director K. Raghavendra Rao opinion as expressed by him, Mama "Mahadevan" is "Saraswati Putra" and 
K. Chakravarthy is "Ekalavya".
His 1977 film Adavi Ramudu (1977 film) was recorded as the highest grossing Telugu film of the 1970s.
Director K. Raghavendra Rao 's father K. S. Prakash Rao mostly worked with Pendyala Nageswara Rao between 1950&1974.
K. Chakravarthy too composed good music for music lover K. Raghavendra Rao previous movies Jyothi (1976 film) and Kalpana (1977 film).

But Production house Sathya Chitra earlier production Tahsildar Gari Ammayi music was scored by Mama. 
Based on their faith, Sathya chitra insisted and retained "Mama" for   N. T. Rama Rao movie Adavi Ramudu (1977 film).
Mama's composition "Krushi vunte Manushulu Rishi avutaaru" (Effort makes Humans Saints) stands testimony to all stake holders of this movie and to every one who believes in determination. 
"Yuva Chitra Arts" banner Producer K. Murari being ardent fan of "Mama" stopped producing movies ever since "Mama" called it a day in his career.
Director Bapu (director), Producer S. Gopala Reddy , Director Kodi Ramakrishna and later in his career actor Mohan Babu loved working with "Mama".
It would be tough to guess between "Swara Brahma" and Director "K. Viswanath" as to, who was elemental in whose fame.
Combined effort returned laurels to art of Cinema. May be "Vidhaata talapuna prabhavinchinadi anaadi Jeevana Vedam".
Contemporary musician P. Bhanumathi criticized "Mama" about his score for movie Sankarabharanam (1980 film) as lighter version Carnatic music  Raga  's rendered by him. Later she even went on to sing a song "Shree Surya Narayanaa Melukoo" for "Mama" in his 1984 movie Mangammagari Manavadu .

His music assistant known as Puhalendi in Telugu film industry was with him like a life partner throughout his life, though scored few films on his own.
Mahadevan-Puhalendi Pukazhenthi as music director duo scored music for 1993 N. T. Rama Rao movie Srinatha Kavi Sarvabhowmudu directed by Bapu (director).

Selected filmography

Tamil

Manonmani (1942) - Credited as Kalyanam Orchestra
Aanandan or Akkini Puraana Magimai (1942) - Credited as Kalyanam Orchestra with G. Ramanathan
Dhana Amaravathi (1947)
Devadasi (1948)
Jambam (1948)
Kumari (1952)
Madana Mohini (1953)
Rohini (1953) - with G. Ramanathan and D. C. Dutt
Naalvar (1953)
Nallakalam (1954)
Mangalyam (1954)
Koondukkili (1954)
Mullaivanam (1955)
Pennarasi (1955)
Asai Anna Arumai Thambi (1955)
Town Bus (1955)
Thaaikkuppin Thaaram (1956)
Mudhalali (1957)
Neelamalai Thirudan (1957)
Sampoorna Ramayanam (1957)
Makkalai Petra Magarasi (1957)
Raja Rajan (1957)
Nalla Idathu Sammandham (1958)
Thai Pirandhal Vazhi Pirakkum (1958)
Pillai Kaniyamudhu (1958)
Bommai Kalyanam (1958)
Neelavukku Neranja Manasu (1958)
Nalla Idathu Sambandham (1958)
Thirudargal Jakkirathai (1958)
Peria Koil (1958)
Sengottai Singam (1958)
Manamulla Maruthaaram (1958)
Panchaali (1959)
Vaazha Vaitha Deivam (1959)
Naalu Veli Nilam (1959)
Abalai Anjugam (1959)
Vannakili (1959)
Madhavi (1959)
Engal Kuladevi (1959)
Kaveriyin Kanavan (1959)
Sollu Thambi Sollu (1959)
Alli Petra Pillai (1959)
Thayapola Pillai Noolapola Selai (1959)
Uzhavukkum Thozhilukkum Vandhanai Seivom (1959)
Padikkadha Medhai (1960)
Aadavantha Deivam (1960)
Veerakkanal (1960)
Ponni Thirunaal (1960)
Panam Panthiyile (1961)
Thayilla Pillai (1961)
Kudumba Thalaivan (1962)
Sarada (1962)
Aasai Alaigal (1963)
Dharmam Thalai Kaakkum (1963)
Iruvar Ullam (1963)
Ratha Thilagam (1963)
Kaithiyin Kathali (1963)
Kattu Roja (1963)
Kulamagal Radhai (1963)
Needhikkuppin Paasam (1963)
Ninaipadharku Neramillai (1963)
Neengadha Ninaivu (1963)
Thulasi Maadam (1963)
Vanambadi (1963)
Yarukku Sontham (1963)
Aayiram Roobai (1964)
Vazhi Piranthadu (1964)
Alli (1964)
Paditha Manaivi (1965)
Thiruvilayadal (1965)
Idhaya Kamalam (1965)
Chinnanchiru Ulagam (1966)Mugaraasi (1966)Saraswati Sabatham (1966)Mahakavi Kalidas (1966)Thiruvarutchelvar (1967)Kandhan Karunai (1967)Vivasayi (1967)Arasa Kattalai (1967)Kan Kanda Deivam (1967)Thaikku thalaimagan (1967)Seetha (1967)Rajathil (1967)Ponnana Vazhvu (1967)Pesum Deivam (1967)Muhurtha Naal (1967)Paladai (1967)Madi Veettu Mappillai (1967)Arasa Kattalai (1967)Andru Kanda Mugam (1968)Panama Pasama (1968)Jeevanaamsam (film) (1968)
  Thillana Mohanambal (1968)Thirumal Perumai (1968)Adimaippenn (1969)Ethiroli (1969)Athiparasakthi (1971)Irulum Oliyum  (1971)Thirumagal (1971)Vasantha Maligai (1972)Kurathi Magan (1972)Nalla Neram (1972)Pattikkattu Ponnaiah (1972)Engal Thanga Raja (1973)Vani Rani (1974)Anbu Thangai (1974)Satyam (1975)Ellaikkodu (1974)Pallandu Vazhga (1975)Uthaman (1976)Enippadigal (1979)Gnana Kuzhandhai (1979)Manmatha Radhangal (1980)Kadhal Kiligal (1981)Antha Rathirikku Satchi Illai (1982)Thoongatha Kannendru Ondru (1982)Mel Maruvathoor Aadhiparasakthi (1985)Mel Maruvathoor Arpudhangal (1986)Paimara Kappal (1988)

Telugu

MalayalamNairu Pidicha Pulivalu (1958) - Background Score onlyAana Valarthiya Vanampadiyude Makan (1971)Padmatheertham(1978)Kayalum Kayarum (1979)Enne Snehikkoo Enne Maathram (1981)Kakka (1982)Piriyilla Naam (1984)Vepraalam (1984)Rangam (1985)Mangalya Charthu (1987)

KannadaManini (1979)Guru Shishyaru (1981)Krishna Rukmini (1988)Shabarimale swamy ayyappa (1990)

Playback Singer

Awards
National Film Award for Best Music Direction (1967) for Kandan Karunai (first recipient of the award)
Tamil Nadu State Film Award for Best Music Director (1969) for Adimai PennNational Film Award for Best Music Direction (1980) for SankarabharanamNandi Award for Best Music Director (1980) for SankarabharanamNandi Award for Best Music Director (1987) for ShrutilayaluNandi Award for Best Music Director (1991) for Manjeera NadamFilmfare Best Music Director Award (Telugu) (1992) for Swathi Kiranam''

Personal life
K.V.Mahadevan, at the time of his death, was survived by his wife, two sons and three daughters. The famous son being V. Mahadevan, whose debut role was that of a Judge in the Tamil film Maasilamani.

Death
K.V. Mahadevan died on 21 June 2001 in Chennai when he was 83.

References

Best Music Direction National Film Award winners
People from Kanyakumari district
Tamil film score composers
Telugu film score composers
Kannada film score composers
Filmfare Awards South winners
Tamil musicians
1918 births
2001 deaths
20th-century Indian musicians
Malayalam film score composers
Indian male film score composers
20th-century male musicians